The 2003 FA Women's Cup Final was an association football match between Fulham Ladies and Charlton Athletic Women on 5 May 2003 at Selhurst Park in London, England. It was the 33rd final overall of the FA Women's Cup, a cup competition originally organised by the Women's Football Association (WFA) between 1970 and 1993, and by The Football Association (FA) since 1993. It was the third successive final for Fulham following their defeat by Arsenal Women in 2001 and their victory over Doncaster Rovers Belles the previous year. The teams had not met before in the FA Women's Cup Final. This was Charlton Athletic's fourth final overall but first under their current name, they had played the previous three as Croydon Women.

The match was played in front of a crowd of 10,389. Charlton almost took the lead after 40 seconds through Amanda Barr but her presentable chance was shot into the side netting. Fulham took the lead in the 18th-minute with a volley scored by Kristy Moore. Charlton's Karen Hills scored an own goal in the 36th-minute to double Fulham's lead, which they maintained to half time. Another own goal from Charlton, this time scored by Fara Williams in the 61st-minute, gave Fulham a 3–0 lead which was the final score. Fulham won the FA Women's Cup for a second time, making it the seventh final in which the previous year's winner was able to retain the cup.

Match

Details

References

External links
 The Women's FA Cup official website

Women's FA Cup finals
Cup
Women's FA Cup Final
Women's FA Cup Final
FA Women's Cup Final, 2003